is a Japanese manga series by Yoshihiro Takahashi, which was serialized between 1976 and 1989 in the magazine Monthly Shōnen Jump.

Story
Shiroi Senshi Yamato is about a white Akita pup who strives to become the champion fighting dog of Yamagata. Over the course of the series, the main villain - Toshio - hires multiple people to attempt to kill Yamato and stop him being champion, which results in many adventures besides the fights themselves.

Characters

Protagonist dogs
Yamato - ヤマト (Akita Inu) The main character of this manga. After saving Ryō's group from some bullies as a puppy, Ryō in turn saved him from being shot down with his father's pack and took him home. He showed incredible tenacity and fighting skill in protecting them from the bullies' dog Gil, Ryō decides to make him a fighting dog. His name was taken from a battle ship called the "Yamato." Yamato always tries to do what's right, though it is often seen backfiring (i.e. he often thinks he's on the right side when he's not, and he is often shown being unable to save what he's protecting) and is affectionate and loyal to his friends. His strongest bonds are with the puppy Musashi, and his owner.
Fubuki - 吹雪 (Akita Inu) Yamato's father, and legendary Yokozuna fighting dog owned and trained by Zenkichi. In a flashback he is shown getting blamed for killing a child and abandoned, where he becomes the boss of a wild pack. He is later shot for stealing from a farm, effectively orphaning Yamato.
Jumbo - ジャンボ (Bulldog) Jumbo is Kosuke's dog and traveling partner. He is a good friend of Yamato. When he and Ryō got lost in the mountains, they got attacked by Black Satan's pack. During this fight, Jumbo lost both ears, an eye, and his hind leg. When Jumbo first met Yamato, he thought he was a female and wanted to marry Yamato.
Hayate - ハヤテ (Akita Inu) Fubuki's son, and Yamato's older brother (supposedly by a different mother). He was originally a beardog who used a knife to kill his prey, but with the appearance of Yamato and Ryō, Ken'ichi makes him a fighting dog. Hayate has good skill, but his quick temper often is the cause of his loss.
Musashi - ムサシ (Tosa Inu) Seiran's son. He fell out of the back of a truck, where he was on his own in the wilderness for a few days. Yamato eventually saved him from becoming an eagle's meal and brought him home, where Ryō's family nurses him back to health and adopts him. His original family eventually comes to take him back, greatly upsetting everyone. At home, Musashi is regularly beat up by his siblings, and his mother when he tries to fight back, so he runs away for good, risking his life in the wilderness to make his way back to Yamato's family. He is very brave, and defends Yamato as often as Yamato protects him.
White Wolf - ホワイトウルフ The boss of a stray pack that used to oppose Black Satan before Yamato defeated him. He appears later to save Musashi from Red Killer, losing his leg in the process, and is considered one of Yamato's friends after that.
Tosaō - 土佐王 (Tosa Inu) Greatest Yokozuna of all. He attacked and killed Ryuu's mother, after she bit his owner for abandoning her, causing Ryuu and his owner to swear revenge against him in battle. However, he redeems himself by defending Ryuu from Black Monster.
Seiran - 青嵐 (Tosa Inu) The mother of Musashi and one of the strongest of Yokozuna fighting dogs. She is killed by Sahara after trying to defend Yamato and her son, Musashi.
Pete - ピート (Tosa Inu) Mayumi's dog. He defeats Jumbo in an earlier match, but is ultimately defeated by Yamato.
Dandy Bill - ダンディービル (Karafuto Dog) Dandy Bill's owner Shiyoko plays a flute for him to make him fight his best. However, in the fight against Bruiser, Toshio destroys the flute, and when Dandy Bill turns to see what happened, he is instantly killed by Bruiser.
Tarōmaru, Jirōmaru, Saburōmaru, Shirōmaru - 太郎丸,次郎丸,三郎丸,四郎丸 (Tosa Inus) Four brothers that appear as Yamato's friends. Tarōmaru is killed by one of Toshio's dogs, inspiring the remaining three's revenge against him.
Tsurugi - 剣 (Akita Inu) A veteran Akita fighting dog. Tsurugi has a mysterious fighting style in which he clouds the ring with dust. As the view gets foggy, he attacks his opponent, and leaves only scratches that seem like no damage at all. But as soon as the opponent lunges, all the wounds open fully, and the dog is instantly covered in blood.
Londo - ロンドー (Great Dane)

Antagonist dogs
Bruiser - ブルーザ (Boxer)
Big Hunter - ビッグハンター (German Shepherd)
Sahara - 沙覇羅 (African wild dog)
Blackey - ブラッキー (Doberman Pinscher/Mastiff mix)
Blackhead Sniper - ブラックヘッドスナイパー (Tosa Inu)
Kabuki - 歌舞伎 (Tosa Inu)
Tekkimen - 鉄鬼面 (Tosa Inu)
Bodybuilder - ボディービルダー (Tosa Inu)
Bayern/Bavaria - バイエルン (German Shepherd) Owned by Neo-Nazi father-and-son-team. Has swastika painted (or burnt) to his chest. (Censored in latest republication of manga.)
Kaiō - 海王 (Tosa Inu)

Other dogs
Lagger/Rugger - ラガー (Weimaraner) Not much is shown of Lagger's fighting style, but he is able to tactically control his opponent as if it were a toy.
Tom Tom - トムトム
Big One - ビッグワン (Bordeaux Mastiff)
Kotetsu - 小鉄 (Tosa Inu) The Tosa that Yamato fought in his debut.

Humans
Ryō Fujiwara Yamato and Musashi's owner.
Toshio Tachibana The main villain. He and his father are constantly trying to kill Yamato.
Kosuke Ishigaki Jumbo's owner.
Ken'ichi Fuyuki Hayate's owner.

Moves of "Shiroi Senshi Yamato"
空中殺法 (Kūchū Sappou - Aerial Killing Method) Used by Big Hunter, Yamato, Vierun, etc.
闘犬魚雷 (Tōken Gyorai - Fighting Dog Torpedo) Used by Kotetsu, Bruiser, Yamato, etc. "Tōken Gyorai" has two versions : offensive-type and defensive-type. The offensive-type is used when the dogs are not locked, and the defensive-type is used when the dog is bitten by the opponent by the neck. This attack smashes the opponent into the showring, head-first.
ジョークラッシュ (Jaw Crash) Used by Bruiser, Yamato, Pete, etc.
まんじゅう潰し (Manjū Tsubushi - Paw Pad Crusher) Manjū is the slang word for pawpad. "Manjū Tsubushi" is the biting of the pawpads. When the pawpads are destroyed, the dog will have to endure agony for few weeks, and disability to walk until recovery.
ネックローリング(Neck Rolling) Used by Hayate. Originally used for bear hunting, this dangerous move will decapitate the opponent. The dog will bite its opponent's neck, and swiftly rolls around the neck several times. At first its fangs will severe the carotid artery, then the neck spine, and finally the whole neck.
牙折り (Kiba Ori - Fang Breaker) Used by Blackey.
スイングサークル(Swing Circle) Used by Tarōmaru.
ノーズツイスト (Nose Twist) Used by Seiran.
ギロチン殺法 (Guillotine Sappou - Guillotine Killing Method) Used by Blue Tiger.
ブーメラン殺法 (Boomerang Sappou - Boomerang Killing Method) Used by Yamato.
ジェットスクリュー (Jet Screw) Used by Yamato during the underwater fight with Lager.
ファイナルサンダー (Final Thunder) Used by Builder.
ドリルスマッシュ (Drill Smash) Used by Kaiō.

Japanese dog fighting ranks
Dogs are ranked accordingly to Sumo wrestling, with the highest rank being "Yokozuna". From highest to lowest:
横綱  - Yokozuna
大関  - Ōzeki
関脇  - Sekiwake
小結  - Komusubi
前頭  - Maegashira
十両  - Jūryō
幕下  - Makushita
三段  - Sandan
序二段- Jun'Nidan
序の口- Jo-no-Kuchi

Other information
 Category: Action / drama
 Publisher: Shūeisha
 Serialized: Monthly Shōnen Jump
 Total of 26 volumes (1st edition)

External links
 http://www.hopeanuoli.com/Yamato/ 

Fictional dogs
1976 manga
Comics about dogs
Shōnen manga
Shueisha manga